Once in a Summer is a 2006 South Korean melodrama/romance film directed by Joh Keun-shik. The film stars Lee Byung-hun and Soo Ae. It won Best Film and Best Director (for Joh) at the 15th Chunsa Film Art Awards in 2007.

Plot
To make up for her poor performance as an assistant producer, a girl promises to have her reserved but very renowned professor appear on their television series. The show involves locating the long-lost loved ones of the participant's past. Although hesitant at first, the professor finally agrees. His story takes the assistant back 50 years—1969—when the world is in chaos.

President Park Chung-hee is a dictator and the students are furious. Suk-young and a group of his classmates travel to the country to escape the tense city and help a small village become up-to-date with newly invented technology. It is there he meets Jung-in, a very pretty girl who is the custodian of the only library. Cheerful and happy, they first run across each other when Suk-young hears Jung-in singing while hanging up laundry. Over the period of time that Suk-young is at the village, they get to know each other more. Although Jung-in is hesitant, she gradually opens up to Suk-young. However, their bumpy courtship is threatened by dark secrets that Jung-in hides about her family and their history in the village, secrets that will haunt the pair as the volatile political climate catches up with them.

Cast
Lee Byung-hun as Yun Suk-young
Soo Ae as Seo Jung-in
Choi Deok-moon as Suk-young's senior 
Jeong Seok-yong as Mr. Kim
Lee Hye-eun as Bok-ja
Lee Se-eun as Lee Su-jin
Na Ki-soo as Suk-young's father
Oh Dal-su as Nam Gyun-soo
Yoo Hae-jin as PD Kim
Kim Kwak-kyung-hee as Condom woman
Park Nam-hee
Kim Jung-ki
Go Jun

Release

Awards and nominations

References

External links
 

South Korean romantic drama films
2000s Korean-language films
Showbox films
2006 romantic drama films
2000s South Korean films